Yang Ziyi (born 14 December 1995) is a Chinese footballer.

Club career
Yang Ziyi started his professional football career in August 2016 when he joined Hong Kong Premier League side R&F (Hong Kong), which was the satellite team of Chinese Super League side Guangzhou R&F. He made his senior league debut on 23 October 2016 in a 2–0 home defeat against Wofoo Tai Po. Yang played 14 league matches for R&F in the 2016–17 season and stayed at the club for another season. On 19 September 2017, he scored his first senior goal in a 3–2 away loss against Hong Kong Pegasus.

Career statistics
 

1League Cups include Hong Kong Senior Challenge Shield and Hong Kong Sapling Cup.

References

1995 births
Living people
Association football midfielders
Chinese footballers
R&F (Hong Kong) players
Footballers from Guangzhou
Hong Kong Premier League players
21st-century Chinese people